(born 26 October 1970) is a Japanese former ski jumper.

Career
His debut World Cup performance was on 16 December 1989 in Sapporo and at the moment he is the oldest ski jumper in a world of ski jumping. Competing in three Winter Olympics, he won two medals in the team large hill event at the Winter Olympics with a silver in 1994 and a gold in 1998.

Okabe had his biggest successes at the FIS Nordic World Ski Championships, winning five medals. This included a gold in the individual normal hill (1995), a silver in the team large hill (1997), and three bronzes in the team large hill (1995, 2007, 2009).

Okabe has five individual World Cup victories, three of which came on flying hills. At the time of his latest win in Kuopio on March 10, 2009 he was, at the age of 38 years and 135 days, the oldest ski jumper to ever win a World Cup competition. This record has since been beaten by his compatriot Noriaki Kasai.

On 12 March 2014, the International Ski Federation announced his retirement.

World Cup

Standings

Wins

References

External links
 
 

1970 births
Ski jumpers at the 1994 Winter Olympics
Ski jumpers at the 1998 Winter Olympics
Ski jumpers at the 2006 Winter Olympics
Japanese male ski jumpers
Living people
Olympic ski jumpers of Japan
People from Hokkaido
Olympic silver medalists for Japan
Olympic gold medalists for Japan
Olympic medalists in ski jumping
FIS Nordic World Ski Championships medalists in ski jumping
Medalists at the 1998 Winter Olympics
Medalists at the 1994 Winter Olympics
Sportspeople from Hokkaido